NDOR may refer to:

National Day of Reason, a secular celebration for humanists, atheists, and other secularists and freethinkers in response to the National Day of Prayer
Nebraska Department of Roads